The 1914 Miami Redskins football team was an American football team that represented Miami University as a member of the Ohio Athletic Conference (OAC) during the 1914 college football season. Led by coach James C. Donnelly in his third and final year, Miami compiled a 5–3 record.  

Donnelly was acting professor of physical education at the school. Donnelly was replaced as head football coach for the 1915 season by Chester J. Roberts.  At the time Miami was changing their philosophy of athletics by moving to an all-year athletic coach.  Donnelly was unable to be in Oxford for the entire school year since he could only take a limited amount of time off from his law practice in Massachusetts.

Schedule

References

Miami
Miami RedHawks football seasons
Miami Redskins football